Caveh Zahedi (born April 29, 1960) is an American film director and actor.

Early years
Zahedi was born in Washington, D.C.,  to Iranian immigrant parents. He studied philosophy at Yale University. Upon graduation, Zahedi moved to Paris, France, to find funding for his films, but failed to interest any French producers in his projects about Arthur Rimbaud, Stéphane Mallarmé, and Eadweard Muybridge. He estranged himself from his idol, Jean-Luc Godard, after calling him at 3 A.M. He also produced an experimental music video of a Talking Heads song, which was rejected by David Byrne.

Los Angeles
Zahedi subsequently returned to Los Angeles to attend UCLA film school. In the UCLA graduate program he completed his first feature film, A Little Stiff (1991), with fellow student Greg Watkins. The film was an experimental narrative in which he re‑enacted his unrequited love for a UCLA art student, using real-life participants. A Little Stiff premiered at the Sundance Film Festival to critical acclaim but no commercial success.

His feature film, I Don't Hate Las Vegas Anymore (1994), documented his attempt to bond with his estranged father and half-brother on a road trip to Las Vegas. The film generated criticism after Zahedi insisted that his father and brother take ecstasy with him on film.

San Francisco
In 1998, Zahedi moved to San Francisco, where he made his next feature, In the Bathtub of the World (2001). The film was a year-long video diary, with the premise of recording one minute every day for an entire year, and editing the footage down to 90 minutes. The film premiered on the Independent Film Channel. In 2001 Zahedi made Tripping with Caveh, a 30‑minute film which was originally intended to be used as a pilot episode for a television show that did not eventuate. It documents a mushroom trip with singer-songwriter Will Oldham (also known as Bonnie "Prince" Billy).

Recent work
In 2005 Caveh's film I Am a Sex Addict was released, which took fifteen years to make due to financial and production difficulties. Through re‑enactments, the film recounted Zahedi's struggle with his addiction to prostitutes and the havoc it wreaked on his marriages and romantic relationships. When the completed project was rejected by Sundance, Zahedi tried to distribute the film himself. It was only after he won the Gotham Award, for "Best Film Not Playing in a Theater Near You", that IFC Films picked up the film. Since that time, Zahedi has made several short films, including "Dada", published by Focus Features, and "The Unmaking of I Am a Sex Addict," released on the DVD magazine Wholphin.

Caveh's latest film The Sheik and I, released in 2012, is a feature-length version of a shorter film commissioned by the Sharjah Biennial. It was subsequently banned in Sharjah.

Zahedi has also appeared in several films in acting roles, including Alexander Payne's Citizen Ruth,  Greg Watkins' A Sign From God, Richard Linklater's Waking Life, and Registered Sex Offender. In September 2009 Zahedi had a role in the small film Unlimited Dreamtime – A 2 Week Film. Zahedi also teaches film classes at The New School in New York.

In 2015, the Factory 25 label released an anthology 6-DVD box set, Digging My Own Grave: The Films of Caveh Zahedi, that collects all of Zahedi's works to date.

More recently, Zahedi has been working on a television series for BRIC TV called The Show About The Show. It is a show about its own making, with each episode detailing the making of the previous episode.

Awards
 1997: Guggenheim Fellowship
 2005: Gotham Awards "Best Film Not Playing in a Theater Near You"
 2008: Rome Prize

References
Notes

External links
 Official site

American film directors
Academic staff of European Graduate School
American male film actors
American people of Iranian descent
1960 births
Living people